Events from the year 1965 in Taiwan, Republic of China. This year is numbered Minguo 54 according to the official Republic of China calendar.

Incumbents
 President – Chiang Kai-shek
 Vice President – Chen Cheng
 Premier – Yen Chia-kan
 Vice Premier – Yu Ching-tang

Events

April
 29 April – The establishment of Kun Shan Institute of Technology in Tainan County.

November
 12 November – The reestablishment of National Palace Museum in Shilin District, Taipei.

Births
 14 January – Wang San-tsai, fencing athlete
 19 January – Donna Chiu, singer
 19 March – Weng Chang-liang, Magistrate of Chiayi County
 27 March – Cho Po-yuan, Magistrate of Changhua County (2005–2014)
 7 May – Tai Chih-yuan, comedian, actor, and show host
 23 May – Kenneth Yen, CEO of Yulon Motor
 6 July – Lee Chun-yi, Deputy Mayor of Chiayi (2001–2004)
 3 September – Yang Hung-duen, Minister of Science and Technology (2016–2017)
 16 September – Lo Kuo-chong, baseball player
 21 September – Kao Chin Su-mei, member of 5th, 6th, 7th, 8th and 9th Legislative Yuan
 16 November – Pauline Lan, host, actress, singer and businesswoman
 1 December – Ma Wen-chun, member of 8th and 9th Legislative Yuan
 4 December – Pasuya Yao, member of 8th and 9th Legislative Yuan

Deaths
 5 March – Chen Cheng, Vice President (1954-1965)

References

 
Years of the 20th century in Taiwan